Morton Salt is an American food company producing salt for food, water conditioning, industrial, agricultural, and road/highway use. Based in Chicago, the business is North America's leading producer and marketer of salt. It is a subsidiary of holding company Stone Canyon Industries Holdings, Inc.

History
The company began in Chicago, Illinois, in 1848 as a small sales agency, Richmond & Company, started by Alonzo Richmond as agents for Onondaga salt companies to sell their salt to the Midwest. In 1910, the business, which had by that time become both a manufacturer and a merchant of salt, was incorporated as the Morton Salt Company. In 1889, it was renamed after the owner, Joy Morton, the son of J. Sterling Morton who founded Arbor Day. Joy Morton started working for E. I. Wheeler in 1880, buying into the company for $10,000, with which he bought a fleet of lake boats to move salt west. In 1969, the name "Morton-Norwich" came into use.

In 1896, Alfred Bevis founded the Bevis Rock Salt Company, building on the failed Lyons salt company in which he had previously invested and run. His daughter, Florence, married Dr. Charles Howard Longstreth, whom Bevis brought into both the Lyons and Bevis salt companies as an executive. Their son, Bevis Longstreth, became president and general manager on his return from service in World War I. In 1919, Morton Salt acquired Bevis. About ten years later, Bevis Longstreth founded Thiokol Corporation, which merged with Morton Salt in 1982 to form Morton-Thiokol. This merger was divested in 1989, following the 1986 Space Shuttle Challenger disaster, which was blamed on Morton-Thiokol products. Morton received the company's consumer chemical products divisions, while Thiokol retained only the space propulsion systems concern.

In 1999, Morton Salt was acquired by the Philadelphia-based Rohm and Haas Company, Inc. and operated as a division of that company along with the Canadian Salt Company, which Morton had acquired in 1954.

On April 2, 2009, it was reported that Morton Salt was being acquired by German fertilizer and salt company K+S for a total enterprise value of US$1.7 billion. The sale, completed by October 2009, was in conjunction with Dow Chemical Company's takeover of Rohm and Haas.

In June 2016, a wall at the Morton Salt storage facility at 1308 N. Elston Avenue, in Chicago, collapsed and tons of salt and brick spilled suddenly onto several cars belonging to a neighboring dealership. No one was injured and investigation initially found that the salt was piled too high. Repairs to part of the roof had also been neglected.

On April 30, 2021, K+S Aktiengesellschaft sold its North and South American business units, including Morton Salt, to Stone Canyon Industry Holdings, Mark Demetree and affiliates for $3.2 billion. The deal closed in April 2021.

Facilities and logo
The Morton Salt Company's current headquarters office is in the River Point building at 444 West Lake Street in Chicago, becoming its first tenant in December 2016. Its previous headquarters was at 123 North Wacker Drive. Prior to its acquisition in 1999, the firm's corporate headquarters was at 100 North Riverside Plaza (later the headquarters of Boeing) and before that at 110 North Wacker Drive and 208 West Washington Street Morton operates a research & development laboratory in Elgin, Illinois, and produces salt at eight vacuum evaporation plants, six underground mines, five solar evaporation plants, and five packaging facilities across the United States, Canada, and The Bahamas.

Acquired in 1954, the company owns the second-largest solar saline operation in North America, in Matthew Town, Inagua, The Bahamas.

Morton Salt's logo features the "Morton Salt Girl", a young girl walking in the rain with an opened umbrella and scattering salt behind her from a cylindrical container of table salt, and has been one of the ten best-known symbols in the United States.  The company's logo and its motto, "When it rains, it pours", both originating in a 1914 advertising campaign, were developed to illustrate the point that Morton Salt was free flowing even in rainy weather. The company began adding magnesium carbonate as an absorbing agent to its table salt in 1911 to ensure that it poured freely.

However, around 1958, the company realized that their salt was not living up to their slogan. A chemist, Richard A. Patton, was given the assignment to solve this problem. He invented a machine that would coat the salt with a byproduct of salt mining, magnesium oxide. Calcium silicate is now used instead for the same purpose. The same chemist developed a total of 27 patents, along with fellow chemists, that expanded Morton's commercialization of magnesium oxide. The Morton Salt Girl, also known as the Umbrella Girl, has gone through seven different iterations, including the latest update in 2014 for its "hundredth birthday", with other updates being in 1921, 1933, 1941, 1956, and 1968; the company sells associated memorabilia and makes some of its vintage advertisements freely available. In 2005, the Morton Salt Girl was shown in MasterCard's "Icons" commercial during Super Bowl XXXIX, which depicts several advertising mascots having dinner together. In addition to the Morton Salt Girl being updated, its centennial in 2014 was celebrated with 100 parties in 100 cities, Morton Salt Girl Centennial Scholarships to benefit certain fine arts and culinary arts students at the School of the Art Institute of Chicago and the Kendall College School of Culinary Arts, Morton Salt Girl day at Wrigley Field, Facebook and Instagram lookalike contests, and other activities. Also in 2014, the Morton Salt Girl was voted into the Advertising Week Walk of Fame on Madison Avenue in New York City; it is the first girl icon to be inducted.

Morton Salt is the sponsor of the Morton Arboretum, a  botanical garden in Lisle, Illinois. It was established by Joy Morton, the company's founder, in 1922 to encourage the display and study of shrubs, trees, and vines. About 300,000 visitors a year hike on miles of trails, and over 3,600 kinds of plants are displayed.

In popular culture

In the 2011 episode "The Fight" of the television series Parks and Recreation, Morton Salt is one of three products publicly endorsed by the character Ron Swanson (Nick Offerman).

The Timbers Army used the Morton Salt Girl in a large tifo display and T-shirts during the kickoff match to the 2013 Major League Soccer season between the Portland Timbers and the New York Red Bulls.

As part of their "Walk Her Walk" campaign, Morton Salt funded the development of the music video "The One Moment" by the band OK Go, released on November 23, 2016.

See also

History of salt
Iodized salt
Sodium chloride

Notes

External links

American companies established in 1848
Brand name condiments
Food manufacturers of the United States
Manufacturing companies based in Chicago
Salt production